The 1896 Svenska Mästerskapet was the first season of Svenska Mästerskapet, the football Cup to determine the Swedish champions. Örgryte IS won the tournament by defeating IS Idrottens Vänner in the final with a 3–0 score.

Final

References 

Print

1896
Mas
Svenska